Antonio César Medina (born 18 December 1984) is an Argentine professional footballer who plays as a midfielder for Boca Unidos.

Career
Chaco For Ever became Medina's first club in 2002, he remained with them for two years until he left to join Textil Mandiyú in 2004 but returned to Chaco For Ever soon after in 2005. After two more years with Chaco For Ever, Medina joined Torneo Argentino A side Boca Unidos in 2007. Three years later, he departed Boca Unidos, after winning the 2008–09 Torneo Argentino A and scoring 16 goals in his last three seasons with them, to sign for Primera B Nacional club Rosario Central. He made his debut on 11 September 2010 against Atlético de Rafaela. On 9 November, Medina scored his first goal for them in a 1–0 win versus Instituto.

He scored 5 goals in 30 games in 2012–13 as Rosario Central won promotion into the 2013–14 Argentine Primera División. He departed in 2014 after participating in 134 league matches for Rosario Central and scoring 18 goals. 2014 saw Medina join Argentine Primera División side Gimnasia y Esgrima. He played 27 times in his first season for Gimnasia, he also scored four goals including two in one match on 11 April 2015 against future team Aldosivi. He joined Aldosivi in July 2016 after two seasons with Gimnasia, he played his first game for Aldosivi on 30 August against Colón. Two goals and twenty-six appearances followed for him.

In December 2018, having terminated his contract with Aldosivi, Medina completed a return to Boca Unidos; now of Torneo Federal A.

Career statistics
.

Honours
Boca Unidos
Torneo Argentino A: 2008–09

Rosario Central
Primera B Nacional: 2012–13

Aldosivi
Primera B Nacional: 2017–18

References

External links

1984 births
Living people
People from Resistencia, Chaco
Argentine footballers
Association football midfielders
Primera Nacional players
Argentine Primera División players
Torneo Federal A players
Chaco For Ever footballers
Textil Mandiyú footballers
Boca Unidos footballers
Rosario Central footballers
Club de Gimnasia y Esgrima La Plata footballers
Aldosivi footballers
Sportspeople from Chaco Province